The 1972 NCAA University Division Tennis Championships were the 27th annual tournaments to determine the national champions of NCAA University Division men's singles, doubles, and team collegiate tennis in the United States.

Trinity (TX) captured the team championship, the Tigers' first such title. Trinity finished six points ahead of Stanford in the final team standings (36–30).

Host site
This year's tournaments were contested at the University of Georgia in Athens, Georgia.

Team scoring
Until 1977, the men's team championship was determined by points awarded based on individual performances in the singles and doubles events.

References

External links
List of NCAA Men's Tennis Champions

NCAA Division I tennis championships
NCAA Division I Tennis Championships
NCAA Division I Tennis Championships
NCAA University Division Tennis Championships